Goniatitinae is one of six subfamilies into which the Goniatitidae is subdivided according to Miller, Furnish, and Schindewolf, 1957. The diagnostic character is the narrow bifurcated (double pronged) ventral lobe of the suture, which lies along the outer rim.  As with the inclusive Goniatitidae, sutures have eight lobes, shells are without prominent ornament, umbilici are small to moderate in size.

Subsequent classifications are somewhat confusing with genera originally included removed elsewhere and others brought in from other subfamilies.

References
 Miller, Furnish, and Schindewolf 1957.  Paleozoic Ammonoidea; Treatise on Invertebrate Paleontology, Part L Ammonoidea. Geologocial Society of America and Univ. of Kansas Press. 
 Saunders, Work, Nikolaeva, 1999. Evolution of Complexity in Paleozoic Ammonoid Sutures, Supplementary Material 

Goniatitidae